The Adams-Toman Cruiser was a US-built civil utility aircraft of the 1920s. It was a three-seat, high-wing monoplane with an enclosed cabin, and possibly a variant of the Grays Harbor Activian. Only one of this model of aircraft was ever built.

Specifications (Cruiser)

References

1920s United States civil utility aircraft
Single-engined tractor aircraft
Cruiser
High-wing aircraft